Charleton is a given name or surname. Notable people with the name include:

Surname
 Brent Charleton (born 1982), Canadian basketball player
Buddy Charleton (1938–2011), American musician
Henry Charleton (1870–1959), British politician
 Peter Charleton (born 1956), Irish judge
Rice Charleton (1710–1789), English physician and researcher
 Robert Charleton (1809–1872), Quaker manufacturer and philanthropist
Robert Charleton (judge) (died 1395/6), English judge
 Walter Charleton (1619–1707), English writer

Middle name
George Charleton Barron (c. 1846–1891), English entertainer

See also

Lewis de Charleton (died 1369), medieval bishop of Hereford
Carleton (given name)
Charleson
Charleston (name)
Charlton (given name)